Šeki snima, pazi se (English: Šeki is Filming, Watch Out!) is a Yugoslav comedy film directed by Marijan Vajda. It was released in 1962.

Considering football sensation Dragoslav Šekularac (nicknamed Šeki, hence the film's title) was probably the first sports superstar in Yugoslavia whose fame transcended sporting bounds, the popularity he enjoyed during his playing heyday was the main reason that Šeki snima, pazi se came about. The film was football-related and was built around his public persona.

The film featured other cult-figure pop icons in smaller roles such as singer Lola Novaković, the band Sedmorica mladih and actor Jovan "Burduš" Janićijević.

External links
 

1962 films
Jadran Film films
Croatian comedy films
1962 comedy films
Yugoslav comedy films
Films set in Yugoslavia